Endless Love is a 1981 American romantic drama film directed by Franco Zeffirelli, starring Brooke Shields and Martin Hewitt. The film marks Tom Cruise's feature film appearance debut.

Based on the 1979 Scott Spencer novel of the same name, the screenplay was written by Judith Rascoe. The original music score was composed by Jonathan Tunick. Although the novel is set in the summer of 1969, the movie transports the action to the early 1980s. The film also discards the non-chronological structure of the novel and tells all the events in chronological sequence.

Critics compared the film unfavorably to the novel, which showcased the dangers of obsessive love. Despite the poor reviews, its eponymous theme song, performed by Diana Ross and Lionel Richie, became a #1 hit on the Billboard Hot 100. The song spent nine weeks at #1 and received Academy Award and Golden Globe Award nominations for "Best Original Song", along with five Grammy Award nominations.

Plot
In suburban Chicago, Jade Butterfield and David Axelrod, fall in love after being introduced by Jade's brother Keith.

The Butterfields' bohemian lifestyle, for which they're well known in their community, allows Jade and David to develop an all-consuming and passionate relationship, including allowing them to have sex in Jade's room. Where her family is open, David's home life is dull; his parents are wealthy liberal political activists who have little interest in his life.

One night, Jade's mother Ann sneaks downstairs, catching Jade and David making love by the fireplace. She starts living vicariously through them but her husband, Hugh, watches them with increasing unease. Jade's nightly trysts begin to negatively impact her grades and her ability to sleep. One night, she tries to steal a prescription sleeping pill from her father but he catches her. As a last straw, Hugh demands that David stop seeing Jade until the end of the school term. Although initially causing a scene, Ann gently coaxes David to agree, telling him not to let Hugh "do something he'll regret".

Back at school, one of David's friends, Billy, tells him that when he was eight, he tried to burn a pile of newspapers, got scared and put the fire out, and his parents thought he was a hero for saving the house from burning. Inspired by this story, David starts a fire on the Butterfields' front porch and walks away. But by the time he returns, the flame has spread too far. David evacuates the Butterfields from the burning house before he is subsequently apprehended.

Following trial, David is convicted of second-degree arson, sentenced to five years' probation, sent to a mental hospital for evaluation and forbidden to go anywhere near Jade or her family again. He continues to write her daily, but the letters aren't sent because of the no-contact order. His parents pull strings to have him released early, much to Hugh's chagrin. Meanwhile, David receives his many letters upon his exit, and after realizing why Jade never wrote back, he decides to pursue her although he knows it is a violation of his parole.

After the loss of their home, the Butterfields moved from Chicago to Manhattan where Ann and Hugh file for divorce. In Manhattan, Ann tries to seduce David but he refuses, leaving her confused. When she isn't looking, he thumbs through her address book, finding out where Jade is and discovers that she now attends the University of Vermont.

Intent on catching a bus to Vermont, David sees Hugh on the street. He starts chasing him, and Hugh is hit by a car and killed. Hugh's fiancée Ingrid arrives to the scene just in time to see David leaving. He comes close to boarding the bus to Vermont, but is overcome with grief and returns to Ann's apartment and consoles her.

Later, Jade goes to David's room to say goodbye but he pulls her back as she tries to leave, throwing her on the bed and holding her down until she admits she loves him. Keith goes to David's to find them together again and tells Jade that David is at fault for their father's death. She refuses to believe it at first but when he confirms that David was actually at the scene, she becomes horrified and hides behind Keith. Trying to explain, David shoves Keith out of the way in a desperate bid to get to her. Keith holds him off until the police arrive and arrest David for brawling, disturbing the peace and violating his parole.

David is sentenced to prison and despairs that he'll never see Jade again. At a lakeside, Jade tells Ann that nobody will ever love her like David does. From behind bars, David sees Jade approach him through his barred cell window.

Cast

Production
Endless Love is based on Scott Spencer's 1979 novel of the same name. The film is directed by Franco Zeffirelli and written by Judith Rascoe. The film stars Brooke Shields and Martin Hewitt in the two leading roles. It is also the film debut of Hewitt, Tom Cruise, Jami Gertz, Jeff Marcus and Ian Ziering. Principal photography of this film began on September 22, 1980 and shot on location in Chicago, New York City, and Long Island as well on set at Astoria Studios in Queens, New York. Production of this film was finished on December 19, 1980.

The MPAA awarded the initial cut of Endless Love an X rating. Director Franco Zeffirelli subsequently made several cuts in the love scenes between Brooke Shields and Martin Hewitt to achieve a lower rating. The film was re-submitted to the MPAA five times before they awarded it an R rating.

Soundtrack

The film's theme song, written by Lionel Richie and performed by Richie and Diana Ross and also called "Endless Love", became a number 1 hit on the Billboard Hot 100, and was the biggest-selling single in Ross' career. Billboard magazine chose it as "The Best Duet of All Time" in 2011, 30 years after its debut. It spent nine weeks at #1 and received Academy Award and Golden Globe Award nominations for "Best Original Song", along with five Grammy Award nominations. The soundtrack peaked at #9 on the Billboard Top 200 and was certified platinum. It also featured a second duet between Ross and Richie, "Dreaming of You", that received considerable airplay but was never released as a single.

Reception

The film received mostly poor reviews on release. Roger Ebert compared the film unfavorably with the novel, describing Martin Hewitt as miscast and criticizing the narrative, although he did praise Brooke Shields' performance:Is there anything good in the movie? Yes. Brooke Shields is good. She is a great natural beauty, and she demonstrates, in a scene of tenderness and concern for Hewitt and in a scene of rage with her father, that she has a strong, unaffected screen acting manner. But the movie as a whole does not understand the particular strengths of the novel that inspired it, does not convince us it understands adolescent love, does not seem to know its characters very well, and is a narrative and logical mess.
Janet Maslin in The New York Times wrote:There are two sorts of people who'll be going to see Endless Love — those who have read the richly imaginative novel on which the movie is based and those who have not. There will be dismay in the first camp, but it may be nothing beside the bewilderment in the second."

Film historian Leonard Maltin seemed to agree, calling the film a "textbook example of how to do everything wrong in a literary adaptation."

In 2014, Scott Spencer, the author of the novel on which the film was based, wrote, "I was frankly surprised that something so tepid and conventional could have been fashioned from my slightly unhinged novel about the glorious destructive violence of erotic obsession". Spencer described the film as a "botched" job and wrote that Franco Zeffirelli "egregiously and ridiculously misunderstood" the novel.

As of November 2021, Endless Love holds a rating of 26% on Rotten Tomatoes based on 19 reviews.

Release and box office

The film premiere for Endless Love took place on July 16, 1981, at the Ziegfeld Theatre in New York City. The film was released the next day. Despite the poor critical reception, the film was a box office success. It made $4,163,623 on its opening weekend and went on to gross $31,184,024 in total, becoming the twenty-second highest earning film domestically in 1981. Internationally, the film took in a further $1,308,650 bringing its total worldwide gross to $32,492,674.

Home media

The film was released on Blu-ray on Shout! Factory in mid-August 2019, with enhanced 5.1 surround sound. It is also available in the streaming format via various providers.

Awards and nominations

Other Honors
American Film Institute:
 100 Passions (2002) – Nominated
 100 Songs (2004): "Endless Love" – Nominated

See also

 Endless Love (2014 American film)
Menstruation and culture

References

External links

 
 
 
 
 

1981 films
1980s coming-of-age drama films
1981 romantic drama films
1980s teen drama films
1980s teen romance films
American coming-of-age drama films
American romantic drama films
American teen drama films
American teen romance films
Coming-of-age romance films
Films about dysfunctional families
Films about virginity
Films based on American novels
Films based on romance novels
Films directed by Franco Zeffirelli
Films set in Chicago
Films shot in Chicago
Films shot in New York City
PolyGram Filmed Entertainment films
Universal Pictures films
Juvenile sexuality in films
1980s English-language films
1980s American films